The Cork (also known as T1 or EC) encoding is a character encoding used for encoding glyphs in fonts. It is named after the city of Cork in Ireland, where during a TeX Users Group (TUG) conference in 1990 a new encoding was introduced for LaTeX. It contains 256 characters supporting most west and east-European languages with the Latin alphabet.

Details 
In 8-bit TeX engines the font encoding has to match the encoding of hyphenation patterns where this encoding is most commonly used. In LaTeX one can switch to this encoding with \usepackage[T1]{fontenc}, while in ConTeXt MkII this is the default encoding already. In modern engines such as XeTeX and LuaTeX Unicode is fully supported and the 8-bit font encodings are obsolete.

Character set

Notes 
 Hexadecimal values under the characters in the table are the Unicode character codes.
 The first 12 characters are often used as combining characters.

Supported languages 
The encoding supports most European languages written in Latin alphabet. Notable exceptions are:
 Esperanto (using IL3)
 Latvian language and Lithuanian language (using L7X)
 Welsh language
Languages with slightly suboptimal support include:
 Galician language, Portuguese language and Spanish language – due to the lack of characters ª and º, which are not superscript versions of lowercase "a" and "o" (superscripts are thinner) and they are often underlined
 Croatian language, Bosnian language, Serbian language – due to the shared use of the slot for Đ
 Turkish language – due to dotless i having different uppercase and lowercase combinations than in other languages

References

External links
Encoding file
Overview of encodings in LaTeX

Character encoding
Character sets
TeX